William James Thompson  (1830 – 5 December 1891) was an English recipient of the Victoria Cross, the highest and most prestigious award for gallantry in the face of the enemy that can be awarded to British and Commonwealth forces.

Details
Thompson was about 27 years old, and a private in the 1st Battalion, 60th Rifles (King's Royal Rifle Corps), British Army during the Indian Mutiny when the following deed took place on 9 July 1857 at Delhi, British India 
Thompson was one of five men of the 1/60th elected under Section 13 of the Royal Warrant to receive the Victoria Cross for the Siege of Delhi. Two months later he was badly wounded in the assault on Delhi on 14 September 1857, the opening day of the battle that lasted until 20 September 1857 when the city was cleared of insurgents. His left arm was amputated and he was invalided out of the Army. The citation, published in the London Gazette of 20 January 1860, concludes with a commendation for his ‘conspicuous conduct throughout the siege’. The citation does not specify Delhi and some sources have interpreted the siege to be the more famous Siege of Lucknow although Thompson was not at Lucknow. The 1/60th was part of the Siege of Delhi, the other four 1/60th citations do state Delhi and the action saving the life of Captain Wilton on 9 July 1857 occurred at Delhi. Thompson was at Delhi between July and September 1857 by which time he had been severely wounded and saw no further active service.

Memorials
His Victoria Cross is displayed at the Royal Green Jackets (Rifles) Museum in Winchester, England. In December 2009, a memorial plaque to Thompson and two other recipients of the Victoria Cross, John Henry Carless and Charles George Bonner, was unveiled at the Town Hall in Walsall, England.

There is a small memorial plaque in St Peter's Church, Yoxall, Staffordshire. It reads:

References

Monuments to Courage (David Harvey, 1999)
The Register of the Victoria Cross (This England, 1997)
The Evolution Of The Victoria Cross (MJ Crook 1975)

External links
Location of grave and VC medal (Staffordshire)

British recipients of the Victoria Cross
King's Royal Rifle Corps soldiers
People from Yoxall
1830 births
1891 deaths
Indian Rebellion of 1857 recipients of the Victoria Cross
British Army recipients of the Victoria Cross
Military personnel from Staffordshire
Burials in Staffordshire